Nicholas "Nick" Lucena (born September 22, 1979) is a retired American professional beach volleyball player.  He and his former teammate, Phil Dalhausser, played in the 2016 Summer Olympics in Rio de Janeiro. He played as a defender behind Dalhausser's block.

Lucena and Dalhausser had qualified to represent the United States at the 2020 Summer Olympics but did not place.

References

External links
 
 
 
 
 
 
 

1979 births
Living people
American men's beach volleyball players
Beach volleyball players at the 2016 Summer Olympics
Olympic beach volleyball players of the United States
Beach volleyball defenders
Sportspeople from Broward County, Florida
Beach volleyball players at the 2020 Summer Olympics